The 2011–12 ABA League was the 11th season of the Adriatic League, with 14 teams from Serbia, Slovenia, Montenegro, Croatia, Bosnia and Herzegovina and Israel participating in it. This was the second time a team from Israel, Maccabi Tel Aviv, participated in the league.

2011–12 ABA League Final Four was held in Yad Eliyahu Arena, Tel Aviv.

Team information

Venues and locations

Head coaches

Regular season 
The regular season began on Saturday, 8 October 2011, and ended on Saturday, 14 April 2012.

Standings

Schedule and results

Stats leaders

Points

Rebounds

Assists

Blocks

Ranking MVP

MVP Round by Round 
{| class="wikitable sortable" style="text-align: center;"
|-
! align="center"|Round
! align="center"|Player
! align="center"|Team
! align="center"|Efficiency
|-
|rowspan=3|1||align="left"| David Simon||align="left"| Radnički||28
|-
|align="left"| Miljan Pavković||align="left"| Radnički||28
|-
|align="left"| D. J. Gay||align="left"| Helios Domžale||28
|-
|2||align="left"| David Simon (2)||align="left"| Radnički||38
|-
|3||align="left"| Nikola Peković||align="left"| Partizan||34
|-
|4||align="left"| Damir Markota||align="left"| Union Olimpija||36
|-
|5||align="left"| Smiljan Pavič||align="left"| Krka||34
|-
|6||align="left"| Nikola Vučević||align="left"| Budućnost||31
|-
|7||align="left"| Vladimir Panić||align="left"| Zlatorog Laško||43
|-
|8||align="left"| Nikola Vučević (2)||align="left"| Budućnost||44
|-
|9||align="left"| Guy Pnini||align="left"| Maccabi Tel Aviv||33
|-
|10||align="left"| Steven Marković||align="left"| Radnički||39
|-
|11||align="left"| Krunoslav Simon||align="left"| Zagreb||35
|-
|12||align="left"| Petar Popović||align="left"| Crvena zvezda||38
|-
|13||align="left"| Vedran Vukušić||align="left"| Cedevita||30
|-
|14||align="left"| Mike Scott||align="left"| Radnički||40
|-
|15||align="left"| Miroslav Raduljica||align="left"| Partizan||47
|-
|16||align="left"| Klemen Prepelič||align="left"| Helios Domžale||40
|-
|rowspan=2|17||align="left"| Mladen Pantić||align="left"| Hemofarm||28
|-
|align="left"| Omar Thomas||align="left"| Crvena zvezda||28
|-
|18||align="left"| Drago Pašalić||align="left"| Helios Domžale||31
|-
|19||align="left"| Mario Kasun||align="left"| Zagreb||35
|-
|20||align="left"| Mario Kasun (2)||align="left"| Zagreb||34
|-
|21||align="left"| Čedomir Vitkovac||align="left"| Budućnost||34
|-
|22||align="left"| Mario Kasun (3)||align="left"| Zagreb||29
|-
|23||align="left"| David Simon (3)||align="left"| Radnički||40
|-
|24||align="left"| Klemen Prepelič (2)||align="left"| Helios Domžale||35
|-
|25||align="left"| Zoran Dragić||align="left"| Krka||29
|-
|26||align="left"| Milan Mačvan||align="left"| Partizan||34
|-
|SF||align="left"| Keith Langford||align="left"| Maccabi Tel Aviv||22
|-
|F||align="left"| Keith Langford (2)||align="left"| Maccabi Tel Aviv||30
|-

Final four 
Matches in, Yad Eliyahu Arena, Tel Aviv, Israel

Semifinals

Final

References

External links 
Official Site
Eurobasket.com League Page
Fantaziranje.com Fantasy for NLB League

2011-12
2011–12 in European basketball leagues
2011–12 in Serbian basketball
2011–12 in Slovenian basketball
2011–12 in Croatian basketball
2011–12 in Bosnia and Herzegovina basketball
2011–12 in Montenegrin basketball
2011–12 in Israeli basketball